Gold has been mined in Scotland for centuries. There was a short-lived gold rush in 1852 at Auchtermuchty and Kinnesswood, and another in 1869 at Kildonan in Sutherland. There have been several attempts to run commercial mines. In the Lowther Hills, Leadhills, and Wanlockhead areas gold prospecting and the extraction of lead metal went hand in hand. From 1424, under the Royal Mines Act, until 1592, gold and silver mined in Scotland were deemed to belong to the crown. The 1592 Act vested rights for gold, silver, lead, copper, tin, and other minerals in the king's feudal tenants or other leaseholders, who would pay 10% of any profit to the crown. The Act also established a Master of Metals as a crown officer, a position held from June 1592 by Lord Menmuir. followed by Thomas Hamilton of Monkland in March 1607.

Medieval records
In 1125 David I of Scotland gave his tenth share of gold mining profits in Fife and Fothrik to Dunfermline Abbey. Fothrik was an area west of Fife, extending towards the Ochils and Alloa. In 1424, James I declared by act of Parliament that gold or silver, and lead ore rich in silver belonged to the crown, as was customary in other kingdoms.

16th-century mining
Mines were opened in 1502 during the reign of James IV of Scotland. The French governor or Regent of Scotland, John Stewart, Duke of Albany had a medallion minted from Scottish gold from Crawford Muir in Lanarkshire. The chronicle of Boece and Bellenden mentions the success of the mines of James IV in Clydesdale where gold and azure, a blue copper mineral, were found with little labour.

James V of Scotland encouraged further efforts, and had personal jewellery made from Scottish "gold of the mine". The Edinburgh goldsmith John Mosman was involved. In 1539 French-speaking miners arrived from the Duchy of Lorraine sent by the Duchess of Guise and Mosman paid their expenses from Edinburgh to the mines at Crawford Moor and for their equipment. The royal accounts specify that many pieces made by Mosman were fashioned from Scottish gold. In 1538 Mosman made a hat badge featuring a mermaid, set with diamonds, from the "Kingis awne gold". Mosman was paid for a nugget of gold, "unwrocht gold of the mynde", that was sent to Duke of Guise, the father of the queen consort Mary of Guise. Mosman added 41 ounces of Scottish gold to the royal crown now kept at Edinburgh Castle.

Reign of Mary, Queen of Scots
In December 1546, during the war known as the Rough Wooing, an English border official Thomas Warton wrote to Thomas Wriothesley about gold-mining in Scotland at Crawford Moor, offering to investigate the ground. Wharton recalled a conversation with the Scottish ambassador Adam Otterburn, who said that James IV had mines but only found loose pieces of gold or gold ore rather than a vein, and had spent more on the work than he recovered. Wharton owned one of the gold medallions coined by Albany, said to be minted from Scottish gold.

Regent Arran had French miners operating a lead mine on Craufordmuir in 1553. English miners were sent to Craufordmuir in July 1554 by Mary of Guise, supported by Robert Carmichael, to prospect for gold. In October 1555 John Carmichael, young Captain of Crauford, was given £560 Scots to buy gold from the miners for Mary of Guise.

Charles Forrest and Thomas Phillop were manging a mine for Mary, Queen of Scots in the summer of 1562. John Stewart of Tarlair, with his son William, were licensed to mine for gold and other metals north of the River Tay to Orkney in March 1546. They were allowed timber from the royal woods for any buildings, and were to sell any gold or silver produced to the royal mint.

A Dutch miner Cornelius de Vos, a shareholder in the English Company of Mines Royal, came to Scotland in 1566 to prospect for gold.  De Vos went to consult with colleagues in Keswick in England, bringing a sample of ore and arousing suspicions. De Vos made contracts for mines and making salt with Mary, Queen of Scots, and her two husbands, Lord Darnley and Bothwell. His mining contracts were renewed by Mary's half-brother, Regent Moray. De Vos was said to have employed men and women, "both ladds and lasses", who otherwise might have begged for a living. Later mineral entrepreneurs and diplomats also stressed the benefits of employment offered by mines.

Reign of James VI
During the rule of Regent Morton who governed Scotland for the young James VI in the 1570s, English and Dutch miners prospected for gold, including Eustachius Roche. According to Stephen Atkinson, a colleague of Bevis Bulmer, the painters Arnold Bronckorst and Nicholas Hilliard came to Scotland in company with Cornelius de Vos. Atkinson may have got this story from the prospector  George Bowes, whose father Sir George Bowes was involved with the acquisition of a portrait of James VI in 1579.

Mines opened by George Douglas of Parkhead came to be managed a goldsmith and financier, Thomas Foulis in the 1590s. In June 1592, the Parliament of Scotland created a new office, the Master of Metals, to have charge of mines, refining, and crown income from mining. John Lindsay of Menmuir was appointed. A surviving letter from this time shows that Douglas of Parkhead's wife Marion Douglas managed a lead mine.

Thomas Foulis had a tack or lease of the gold mines in "Crauford and Robert Muires" in 1595. Custom or duty from the gold extracted due to James VI, under the terms of the 1592 Act, amounted to £666-13s-6d Scots. Foulis was trusted to spend this sum on the king's behalf along with the subsidy granted to James VI by Elizabeth I. The English prospector George Bowes, a nephew of the ambassador Robert Bowes, made an arrangement to work with Foulis, but Elizabeth I disapproved. Another English entrepreneur Bevis Bulmer formed a partnership with Foulis.

Seventeenth century
After the Union of the Crowns, George Bowes worked with Bulmer, who eventually acquired his mining interests. Bowes sent a progress report from Leadhills on 10 December 1603 to the Earl of Suffolk. They had seen trays washes with gold in two locations, where Archibald Napier of Merchiston had previously found gold, despite poor weather. Bowes thought the geology was promising, even if there was no vein of gold, only gold found by washing, and the lead and copper would be profitable. Bowes sent a second report on 22 December, outlining the observations that led him to think there might not be a vein of gold. He noted that the Laird of Merchiston had found gold by washing in the Pentland Hills, on Crawford Moor, and by Megget Water, but there were no reports of a vein. As many as 300 people had been employed in washing for gold near Leadhills. Nevertheless, the geology was promising, and the Laird of Merchiston had shown him a stray find of gold admixed in "spar" as if it came from vein.  A veteran miner had told him that his father had been a labourer for German miners 90 years before, and they had found a vein of gold (apparently in the time of Regent Albany). Bowes was anxious to secure funding from the (English) Privy Council and had to meet their conditions. He mentioned that employing people as gold washers was a good policy, because they could labour in a mine when a vein was a found.

A paper on gold mining in Scotland, partly burnt in the Cotton library fire, repeats similar information and discussion about veins and washed gold. It was probably compiled at this time by George Bowes. Bowes got funding to continue, receiving £100 for working minerals at "Winlockwater" on 7 February 1603, while Bevis Bulmer got £200 for his discoveries of Scottish gold. In February 1605 the Venetian ambassador Nicolò Molin described Bowes' progress. Molin noted that Bowes had told Queen Elizabeth about gold mines in Scotland, but she had arrested him. Bowes had found support from King James and produced 25 ounces of gold but with large costs, and was losing investors and supporters.

Silver was discovered on lands at Hilderston near Bathgate in 1607. Bevis Bulmer and Thomas Foulis opened a silver mine called "God's Blessing". The site at Hilderston was developed by Bulmer, as the "governor of the works of his majesty's mines under ground", with George Bruce of Carnock acting as treasurer. In 1613 Foulis obtained the contract for the mine with William Alexander of Menstrie and Paulo Pinto from Portugal.

Stephen Atkinson worked at Hilderston. He wrote a speculative tract or prospectus on gold mining in Scotland in 1619, based on his experiences with Bevis Bulmer, the reports written by Bowes, and anecdotes he had heard of earlier miners. This was printed in the 19th century and has often been quoted by historians. Atkinson wrote that Bowes had found a vein of gold in Elizabeth's reign, although Bowes's letters don't mention such a find.

In 1626 Charles I gave a licence to Andrew Huntar of Aberdeen to prospect for precious stones, silver, and gold in the lands north of the River Dee and take samples for assay. A beam engine installed at Wanlockhead in 1870 forms the centrepiece of the Museum of Lead Mining, where the history of gold mining in the region is also interpreted.

Present day
More recently gold deposits in quartz were discovered at Cononish Farm on Beinn Chùirn near Tyndrum at the northern end of the Loch Lomond and The Trossachs National Park. Lead and zinc had been mined in the area in the 17th and 18th centuries. After gaining planning permissions and making commitments to ecological conservation and mitigation in Glen Cononish in 2011, the gold mine continues to develop.

The Tyndrum workings are operated by Scotgold Resources. A vein of quartz includes pyrites and sulphide compounds which may carry gold inclusions. Material extracted from the mine is reduced and ground down on site, and sent abroad for refining. Research is taking place in the use of plants to recover gold and other metal traces from the mining spoil and wastes generated at Tyndrum, a process known as "phytomining", a kind of phytoextraction process.

Gold panning continues in Scotland, and licences can be obtained at the Museum of Lead Mining at Wanlockhead.

External links
 Gold panning: Museum of Lead Mining, Wanlockhead
 Fiona Russell: A Corbett & a gold mine: Beinn Chuirn
 Scotland's Largest Gold Nugget now on Display at The Hunterian Hunterian Museum and Art Gallery

References

Gold mines in Scotland
Gold mining in the United Kingdom
Gold mining
Economic history of Scotland
Industrial history of Scotland
Monarchy and money